Arnold Cove is a cove along the west margin of McMurdo Sound between Gneiss Point and Marble Point, Victoria Land. It was named by the Advisory Committee on Antarctic Names for Charles L. Arnold, leader of a United States Antarctic Research Program party that made an engineering study of Marble Point, McMurdo Station and Williams Field in the 1971–72 season.

References
 

Coves of Antarctica
Landforms of Victoria Land
Scott Coast